Pille Lill (born on April 20 in 1962) is an Estonian opera singer (soprano) and an active member of the cultural life, the founder and artistic director of PLMF Music Trust.

Biography 
Pille Lill started her journey as a musician with piano studies at Pärnu Children's Music School. She has graduated the Estonian Academy of Music and Theater (EAMT) with two specialties – music pedagogy/choir conducting (prof. Artur Vahter) and opera singing (assist. prof. Rostislav Gurjev). She continued her studies as an operasinger at Helsinki Sibelius Academy (prof. Mirja Klemi) and after that at the post graduate level of the London Guildhall School of Music and Drama (prof. Johanna Peters). She defended her master's degree at the Sibelius Academy (2003, prof. Liisa Linko-Malmio). During 2004–2011 she furthered her skills at the doctorate level of EAMT (prof. Jaakko Ryhänen), in the context of which she studied at the University of Music Karlsruhe in 2005-2006 in the German lied class (Professors Hartmut Höll and Mitsuko Shirai). She has taken part of several masterclasses by world-famous distinguished musicians - Elisabeth Söderström, Irwin Gage, Emma Kirkby, Mauriz Sillem, Gerhard Kahry, Eva Märtson-Wilson, Andre Orlowitz, Wilma Vernocchi, Gundula Hinz etc.

Pille Lill has been a vocal teacher in the Voice Department of EAMT from 1997 to 2003 (assistant professor from 2003), instructed master’s level students in German lied class (2007-2013) and directed EAMT's opera studio (2004-2005). She has given master classes in many countries (Estonia, Germany, Finland, Belarus, Latvia, Russia, Israel, Italy) and her most outstanding students either have worked or are working at the Estonian National Opera (Helen Lokuta, Angelika Mikk, Olga Zaitseva, Oliver Kuusik) and Latvian National Opera (Marlena Keine). She has been a part of the jury of the Estonian National Vocal Contest (2009, 2013, 2017, 2022) and St. Petersburg Chopin (2015, 2019) and Rachmaninov (2016) International Competition for singers, Jerusalem Young Artist Opera Festival Competition (2018) and T.O.S.C.A Opera Singers Competition in Italy (2018, 2022).

Pille Lill is the founder and artistic director of the PLMF Music Trust from 2003. The goal of the organisation is to support talented musicians by offering further education and performing opportunities on various stages in Estonia and abroad. PLMF is developing diverse cross border cooperation through being a part of International Artist Managers’ Association(IAMA),  European Festivals’ Association (EFA) and International Society for the Performing Arts (ISPA). PLMF has created four festivals - Tallinn Chamber Music Festival (including every-year prizes for the musicians), Tallinn Winter Festival (including good deed initiative with the motto "Open your eyes, open your heart"), Eivere Piano Festival (with Summer School for pianists), Väike-Maarja Music Festival (including National Vocal Contest, which is dedicated to the early deceased outstanding tenor Vello Jürna). In addition, PLMF is organizing Rapla Church Music Festival from 2010, which is featuring International Rapla Summer Academy for singers.

Pille Lill is a board member of the Estonian Chamber of Culture from 2015 and was a board member of Finnish-Estonian Culture Fund 2016-2020. From 2003-2009 she was a board member of the Association of Estonian Professional Musicians. From 2017 Pille Lill is a part of the Pro Patria and Res Publica Union and the spokesperson of their Cultural Policy Council.

Discography 
Pille Lill has performed as an opera, oratorio and chamber music singer in numerous countries. She has sung lead roles in nearly 30 operas: 
Mozart – Countess "Marriage of Figaro", Donna Anna "Don Giovanni", Pamina "Magic Flute"; 
Puccini - Mimi "La Bohéme", Cio-cio san "Madama Butterfly", Tosca "Tosca"; 
Verdi - Elisabeth "Don Carlos", Desdemona "Othello", Violetta "Traviata", Elvira "Ernani", Amelia "Un ballo in maschera", Lady Macbeth "Macbeth", Aida "Aida"; 
Weber – Agathe "Der Freischütz"; 
Wagner - Venus "Tannhäuser"; 
Tchaikovsky - Liza "The Queen of Spades"; 
Mascagni - Santuzza "Cavalleria Rusticana"; 
Strauss - Chrysothemis "Elektra";
Tubin - Barbara "Barbara von Tisenhusen";
Prokofjev - Fata Morgana "The Love for Three Oranges" etc.

Her repertory includes a number of soprano parts from such grand musical pieces:
Mahler - 4. and 8. Symphony;
Mozart - "Requiem"; 
Brahms - "Requiem"; 
Verdi - "Requiem"; 
Beethoven - "9. Symphony";
Tobias - "Des Jona Sendung"; 
Shostakovich - "14. Symphony";
Sibelius - "Kullervo" etc.

She has premiered works by many contemporary composers (Lepo Sumera, Põldmäe, Kaumann, Pertmann, Pozdejev, Andersson, Reinvere etc).

Pille Lill has cooperated with many distinguished conductors (Gennady Rozhdestvensky, Carlo Felice Cillario, Neeme Järvi, Eri Klas, Carlos Miguel Prieto, John Storgårds, Gintaras Rinkevičius, Arvo Volmer, Mihkel Kütson, Jüri Alperten, Olari Elts, Andres Mustonen, Anu Tali, Paul Mägi, Lauri Sirp, Risto Joost etc.) and her voice is captured on numerous recordings for Estonian Public Broadcasting and on many CD-s - R. Tobias “Des Jona Sendung” (con. N. Järvi - 1995 Grammofon AB BIS; 2009 DVD, VAI), M. Sink "Christmas Songs" (PLMF 2006), L. Sumera “To Reach Yesterday” (Megadisc 2005), A. Kapp “Organ and Chamber Music” (Eres 2000), J. Torrim “Organ Music” (Antes 1997).

Acknowledgements 
 Big Dipper Award for Best Female Singer  (1996)
 grantee of the Wagner Society Scholarship (1998)
 Georg Ots Award – Best Singer (2002)
 3rd class honoree of the Order of Bishop Platon (2005)
 UNICEF Bluebird Award (2009)
Cultural Endowment of Estonia Award (2014)
 4th class Order of the White Star (2016)
 Esther of the Evangelical Lutheran Church of Estonia (2017)
 Order of Tallinn (2019)
 Annual award of the Rapla County Expert Group of the Cultural Endowment (2020)
 Rapla county silver coat of arms (2020)

References

External links 
PLMF Music Trust

20th-century Estonian women opera singers
Estonian operatic sopranos
1962 births
Living people
21st-century Estonian women opera singers
Recipients of the Order of the White Star, 4th Class